Konstantinos Chrysopoulos (born 21 May 2003) is a Greek professional footballer who plays as a centre-back for Super League 2 club Olympiacos B.

References

2003 births
Living people
Greek footballers
Super League Greece 2 players
Olympiacos F.C. B players
Association football defenders
Footballers from Thessaloniki